"The Fear Reaper" is the second episode of the fourth season and 68th episode overall from the Fox series Gotham. The show is itself based on the characters created by DC Comics set in the Batman mythology. The episode was written by executive producer Danny Cannon and directed by Louis Shaw Milito. It was first broadcast on September 28, 2017.

In the episode, Gordon goes after Jonathan Crane, now calling himself "The Scarecrow". Planning to expose his demons, Jonathan makes a mutiny in Arkham Asylum and Gordon, all alone, decides to go and face it himself. Jonathan puts all the prisoners with the fear gas and all are under his control. Meanwhile, Cobblepot continues confronting the GCPD's methods and seeks to form an alliance with Barbara, who is revealed to be alive, but Barbara still has some plans under her arm. At the same time, Bruce continues his journey to his night activities.

The episode receive generally positive reviews with critics praising Bruce's storyline and Tahan's performance but the Arkham storyline received criticism.

Plot
The GCPD arrives at the Crane house to discover the experimentation tests. Gordon (Ben McKenzie) and Bullock (Donal Logue) then discover Grady (Michael Maize) tied, scarily yelling that "The Scarecrow" is coming.

Bruce (David Mazouz) manages to get released from the GCPD, claiming he was on the roof and accidentally falling off in the wrong time. Although suspecting him, Gordon decides to let him go but Fox (Chris Chalk) also suspects about Bruce. In Arkham Asylum, Warden Reed (Damian Young) destroys his evidence when he is visited by Jonathan (Charlie Tahan) in his Scarecrow persona. Jonathan sprays him with fear gas and makes him face his biggest fears. He then sprays the rest of the inmates in the infirmary.

Cobblepot (Robin Lord Taylor) arrives at the GCPD and confronts Gordon for not catching Jonathan while also being teased for his ridicule in the club opening. They then a make a deal in which Gordon needs to catch Jonathan within 24 hours, otherwise Cobblepot will clean the city his way. Meanwhile, Selina (Camren Bicondova) and Tabitha (Jessica Lucas) are summoned to a building after they've received a card saying "An Opportunity Awaits"  where they shockingly discover Barbara (Erin Richards) is alive and well. After getting on to trust her, she proposes to build a new criminal empire selling weapons for the new criminals but she can't go forward without their help, Tabitha refuses saying that she killed Butch and took everything from her and she leaves in a fit, she then tells Selina to talk to her about it and says that this would be good for us. She also negotiates with Cobblepot to become partners with them.

Gordon decides to go to stop the mutiny in Arkham but everyone in the precinct, including Bullock (Donal Logue) refuse to go with him. Inspecting an area, he is attacked by the mutineers while Jonathan decides to set his revenge on him for killing his father. After chasing him, Jonathan sprays him with the gas, making Gordon hallucinate Lee's (Morena Baccarin) suicide. Jonathan tries to compel him to kill himself but Gordon resists. He is then attacked by inmates in a hall but upon defending himself with water, he discovers water dissolves the gas. He uses a ceiling sprayer to heal everyone but Jonathan escapes. Bruce begins stalking a gang to a building but is caught and severely attacked by the gang before finally using his skills to defeat them and escape. He is confronted by the leader when he is knocked out by Alfred (Sean Pertwee). While arguing in Wayne Manor, they are visited by Fox. Fox says that he is aware of his activities but he also developed a special suit that Wayne Enterprises used for military purposes.

Tabitha and Selina eventually decide to team up with Barbara but Tabitha decides to first chop off Barbara's hand as she and Butch both lost their hands by Cobblepot. This is revealed to be just a test to prove her trust and she spares her saying she'll start work on Monday. Gordon arrives at the GCPD and is confronted by Cobblepot, who berates him and even tells the fellow officers to go working for him. Ivy (Maggie Geha) decides to retrieve some potions from a store and interrogates the man with her perfume to give her the combination to the safe. After consuming them, her face begins to mutate. Gordon and Bullock go to a bar where Harvey suggests that they would require an army to take down Cobblepot. Gordon then decides to go and visit Falcone. That night, Bruce begins practicing on his new suit.

Production

Development
In June 2017, it was announced that the second episode of the season would be titled "The Fear Reaper" and was to be written by Danny Cannon and directed by Louis Shaw Milito.

Writing
According to Stephens, the episode handles a horror-oriented direction on the season: "At the very beginning of the season, Penguin has solidified his control upon Gotham like never before. Where he's kind of unionized crime. And Scarecrow comes in to basically reintroduce fear into Gotham and to remind people that the dark is still scary out there. And we're really going to fashion, especially Episode 2, almost a horror movie episode where we really get to see Scarecrow. I think he's like purely terrifying. Imagine, rather than the other versions of Scarecrow out there — because there are a lot of different versions — what if you just really tell Scarecrow as a horror movie? Because he could be scary as hell." Executive producer Danny Cannon stated, "When the studio asks you to tone back because it's too scary, you know you've done something right!"

Casting
Cory Michael Smith, Drew Powell, Crystal Reed and Alexander Siddig don't appear in the episode as their respective characters, with Smith and Siddig receiving credit only, while Powell and Reed were uncredited. In September 2017, it was announced that the guest cast for the episode would include Michael Maize as Grady Harris, Charlie Tahan as Jonathan Crane, Anthony Carrigan as Victor Zsasz, Damian Young as Warden Reed and Maggie Geha as Ivy Pepper.

Reception

Viewers
The episode was watched by 2.87 million viewers with a 0.9/3 share among adults aged 18 to 49. This was an 11% decrease in viewership from the previous episode, which was watched by 3.21 million viewers with a 1.0/4 in the 18-49 demographics. With these ratings, Gotham ranked second Fox, behind The Orville, and tenth for the night, behind How to Get Away with Murder, The Orville, Superstore, Great News, The Good Place, Chicago Fire, Grey's Anatomy, Thursday Night Football, and Will & Grace.

Critical reviews

"A Dark Knight: The Fear Reaper" received generally positive reviews from critics. Matt Fowler of IGN gave the episode a "good" 7.2 out of 10 and wrote in his verdict, "While Scarecrow screamed, swung his scythe, and sprayed lunatics with fear toxin, this episode honed in some more on the GCPD's current crisis of conscience. It's an interesting journey to take but also one that smacks of the shows past sins regarding a poorly-manned (and conceived) police force - with Jim Gordon now trying to be the guiding light."

Nick Hogan of TV Overmind gave the episode a 3.5 star rating out of 5, writing "Overall, I'm still on the fence about Season 4. There's a lot of potential here for some wonderful stories, but is it too early for Batman? If it's not too early for Batman, is it too similar to the Christopher Nolan films? I suppose only time will tell. For now, I'm still in, and this is still a fun show." Sydney Bucksbaum of The Hollywood Reporter wrote, "Despite getting electrocuted last season, Babs (Erin Richards) made her return to Gotham this week, albeit more calm than usual. No matter what, it's amazing to see Babs and Tabs on the same side again. We could be seeing Gotham City Sirens on TV before the movie comes out."

Vinnie Mancuso of Collider wrote, "Really, the water issue is just indicative of 'The Fear Reaper' as a whole, which is as lazy an episode of Gotham as you're ever going to get." Lisa Babick of TV Fanatic gave the series a 4.8 star rating out of 5, writing "Now that Bruce is all teched up, with Alfred's help he should be able to fight bigger and better crimes. Maybe Penguin's goons won't be the ones to capture Crane; maybe Bruce will be the hero on this one. The interesting part of this story will be when Jim catches a whiff that there's a vigilante on the loose, and capturing Crane might be the thing that puts Bruce on the map." Kayti Burt of Den of Geek wrote, "This group has come a long way since that time Barbara let Selina and Ivy live in her sweet penthouse apartment back in Season 1 (I really hope Gotham references this at some point this season). I am 100% in for Gothams twisted Birds of Prey storyline. If you need pointers, Bruce Wayne and the GCPD. This is what poetic justice looks like on Gotham."

References

External links 
 

Gotham (season 4) episodes
2017 American television episodes